Banyana – Children of Africa is a 1976 jazz album by Abdullah Ibrahim.

Recording and music
The album was recorded in January 1976. It is predominantly a piano trio recording, with Abdullah Ibrahim on piano, Cecil McBee on bass, and Roy Brooks on drums. On "Ishmael", Ibrahim also plays soprano saxophone and sings.

Release and reception

The album was released by Enja Records. The AllMusic reviewer concluded that, "Some of the unpredictable music gets a bit intense (Ibrahim is in consistently adventurous form) but his flights always return to earth and have an air of optimism. An above average effort from a true individualist." The Penguin Guide to Jazz described it as "A set of strongly coloured African themes, containing the germ of Ibrahim's 1980s work with Carlos Ward and Ekaya."

Track listing 
 "Banyana – Children of Africa" – 2:00
 "Asr" – 8:16
 "Ishmael" – 15:02
 "The Honey Bird" – 6:18
 "The Dream" – 6:42
 "Yukio Khalifa" – 10:23
 "Ishmael" (alternative take) – 12:59

Personnel 
 Abdullah Ibrahim – piano, soprano saxophone, voice
 Cecil McBee – double bass
 Roy Brooks – drums

References

1976 albums
Abdullah Ibrahim albums
Enja Records albums